Cyazofamid is a fungicide that is highly-specific in controlling oomycete plant pathogens such as Phytophthora infestans, the organism which causes late blight in potato. Its mode of action is thought to involve binding to the Qi center of Coenzyme Q – cytochrome c reductase.

Cyazofamid is most often sold under the brand name Ranman.

Synthesis 
Processes to manufacture cyazofamid were disclosed in patents from Ishihara Sangyo Kaisha, Ltd. An acetophenone derivative was first treated with aqueous glyoxal and hydroxylamine to form an oxime-substituted imidazole ring system. This intermediate was treated with thionyl chloride and disulfur dichloride to convert the oxime to a cyano group and chlorinate the imidazole in the position next to the phenyl ring. Finally, treatment with dimethylsulfamoyl chloride gave cyazofamid, with the desired regiochemistry. This placed the sulfamoyl group on the nitrogen adjacent to the phenyl ring rather than the chlorine atom. The structure of the fungicide has been confirmed by X-ray crystallography.

References

Further reading
 AGRIS id JP2004007452. CiNii NAID 130004444938. ISSN-L 0385-1559.

External links

Fungicides
Sulfonamides
Imidazole antifungals
Nitriles
Chloroarenes